Daniele Antonio Forte (born 7 September 1990) is an Italian professional footballer who plays as a midfielder for  club Arezzo.

Career
Born in Foggia, Apulia, Forte started his career at hometown club U.S. Foggia, which he was a player in the reserve league in 2008–09 season. In 2009, he left for Serie D club Real Montecchio, located in Marche. He played 30 games for the relegated club. In 2010, he was signed by professional club A.C. Bellaria – Igea Marina, which he spent 2 seasons with the Romagna club in Lega Pro Seconda Divisione. On 28 May 2012 Forte was signed by Cesena, the major club of the region. The club also signed former Bellaria coach Nicola Campedelli, whom the brother of Cesena president Igor, as well as signing 3 Bellaria team-mate in June 2012, namely Caio De Cenco, Daniele Fioretti and Marco Mariani.

Forte remained in Cesena in the first half of 2012–13 Serie B, however he failed to play any game. He picked no.4 shirt for the first team. On 9 January 2013 Forte and Fioretti were signed by Borgo-a-Buggiano.

On 15 July 2013 Forte left for Forlì. On 14 January 2014 he was signed by Foggia Calcio in another temporary deal. Both clubs qualified to Lega Pro Divisione Unica as the playoffs winner of Group A of 2013–14 season and the 5th of Group B of 2013–14 Lega Pro Seconda Divisione respectively, which the first and second division of Lega Pro (ex–Serie C) merged.

On 13 July 2019, he signed with Serie D club Turris.

On 1 August 2020, he returned to Arzignano. On 17 October 2021, he played his 100 game for Arzignano against Delta Porto Tolle.

On 22 July 2022, Forte moved to Arezzo in Serie D.

References

External links
 AIC profile (data by football.it) 
 

1990 births
Living people
Sportspeople from Foggia
Footballers from Apulia
Italian footballers
Association football midfielders
Serie C players
Lega Pro Seconda Divisione players
Serie D players
A.C. Bellaria Igea Marina players
A.C. Cesena players
Forlì F.C. players
Calcio Foggia 1920 players
Ravenna F.C. players
F.C. Arzignano Valchiampo players
S.S. Turris Calcio players
S.S. Arezzo players